Nickorick Beach is a hamlet on the southern shore of Wakaw Lake in Hoodoo No. 401, Saskatchewan, Canada. The hamlet is located north of the intersections of Highway 41 and Range road 260 on Range road 260, approximately 10 km north of the Town of Wakaw.

See also

 List of communities in Saskatchewan
 Hamlets of Saskatchewan

References

External links

Hoodoo No. 401, Saskatchewan
Unincorporated communities in Saskatchewan
Division No. 15, Saskatchewan